Jeffrey "Jeff" Cook was an All-American lacrosse player at Johns Hopkins University from 1979 to 1982.

Lacrosse career

Cook who prepped at St. Paul's School (Brooklandville, Maryland) and McDonogh School, led Johns Hopkins to a 51 and 5 record during his time there. With the Blue Jays, Cook won national titles in 1979 and 1980. He is ranked sixth all-time in Hopkin's career scoring with 219 points. Cook earned first-team All America honors two years and second-team honors while in college, as well as being named the National Collegiate Player of the Year and the National Collegiate Attackman of the Year winner in 1981.

Cook also led Hopkins to championship finals in 1981 and 1982, getting upset by UNC 14-13, Hopkins' first title game loss in the preceding four years, and losing also to North Carolina 7-5 in 1982.

Cook had a six goal performance in the 14-13 finals loss to North Carolina in 1981. In that game he had a seventh goal disallowed because the referees did not see that Cook's shot had gone into the goal and out the other side, through the net.

Cook played for USA in the 1982 Lacrosse World Championships hosted in Baltimore, Maryland.

Post-lacrosse

Cook was elected to the National Lacrosse Hall of Fame in 2006.

Cook, the three-time All-American, died April 12, 2011.

Statistics

Johns Hopkins University

Accomplishments
1979 Division I National Title
1980 Division I National Title
1981 National Collegiate Player of the Year
1981 National Collegiate Attackman of the Year
1982 National Collegiate Attackman of the Year
1982 World Lacrosse Championship Title (United States)

See also
1979 NCAA Division I Men's Lacrosse Championship
1980 NCAA Division I Men's Lacrosse Championship
Johns Hopkins Blue Jays lacrosse
National Lacrosse Hall of Fame
World Lacrosse Championship

References

External links
Former Hopkins Standout Jeff Cook Elected to National Lacrosse Hall of Fame, Three-Time All-American Becomes 62nd JHU Inductee, June 30, 2006, Hopkins Sports
Jeffrey G. Cook - National Lacrosse Hall of Fame
Jeff Cook, Johns Hopkins '82, Passes Away

Awards

American lacrosse players
Johns Hopkins Blue Jays men's lacrosse players
Place of birth missing
People from Howard County, Maryland
1960 births
2011 deaths